Momas is a commune in France.  It is located in the Pyrénées-Atlantiques departement, in the region of Nouvelle-Aquitaine.

See also
Communes of the Pyrénées-Atlantiques department

References

External links

Official site

Communes of Pyrénées-Atlantiques